Mohamed Rifnas (born 9 January 1995) is a Sri Lankan professional footballer who plays as a midfielder for Colombo FC in the Sri Lanka Football Premier League. He operates primarily as a central midfielder and is comfortable playing both in attack and defense.

Career
Rifnas began his club career with Colombo FC in 2011 as a teenager & promoted the club from Division 1 to Champions League. After helping Colombo FC to the FA CUP finals, Renown Sports Club of the Sri Lanka Football Premier League made an effort to sign Rifnas's elder brother to the team. He made a midfield partnership with Fazul Rahman & his brother Rizni throughout the season, and earned two consecutive Golden Boot awards. On March 28, 2018, Rifnas officially transferred to his childhood club, Colombo FC, after rumors had been spread about his transfer.

International
Rifnas made his debut for Sri Lanka on 26 August 2014 against Seychelles and scored his first goal for his country in the 78th minute. That goal proved to be the winning goal as Sri Lanka won 2–1. Rifnas was then selected to be part of Sri Lanka's side for the 2015 SAFF Championship, where he was named as one of the top young players to watch during the tournament. He scored the winning goal for Sri Lanka in their opening match of the tournament against Nepal in the fifth minute of stoppage time after the second half. Sri Lanka won 1–0.

International goals

Score and result list Sri Lanka's goal tally first.

Career statistics

International

References

1995 births
Living people
Sri Lankan footballers
Renown SC players
Association football midfielders
Sri Lanka international footballers
Sri Lankan Muslims
Sri Lanka Football Premier League players